Marudur may refer to:

Marudur, Karur A panchayat town in karur district in India.
Marudur, Coimbatore A panchayat village in coimbatore in India.